Frédérick Têtu is a teacher born in the city of Québec (Qc, Canada) in 1967. He holds a B.A. and a master's degree in philosophy from the Université Laval (Canada), and a bachelor of law (LL.B) from McGill University (Canada). He has done further studies in political science at Boston College (USA).

In 2017 he co-founded Quebec municipal party "Québec 21" to challenge sitting mayor Régis Labeaume. He also announced, on June 1, 2017, that he would run for a seat as municipal councilor.

However, after giving a radio interview while highly intoxicated (alcohol), he quit the campaign and never came back. In a post-interview, radio anchor Yannick Marceau said he kept Têtu in the studio to "protect other drivers on the road" signalling the candidate might otherwise have driven under influence.

References

Other external links

Éditions Résurgences: http://www.resurgence.be/
Cégep François-Xavier-Garneau: http://www.cegep-fxg.qc.ca/
The Quiet Illusion: http://www.lillusiontranquille.com/

Living people
Canadian philosophers
Canadian educators
Morrissey College of Arts & Sciences alumni
1967 births
Université Laval alumni
McGill University Faculty of Law alumni